The peanut butter blossom cookie originated in 1957, is made with a peanut butter cookie dough, and is topped with a piece of chocolate candy. The cookie is considered a snack or dessert and is often served at events or during holidays in the United States.

The exact term "peanut butter blossom cookie" refers to the original variation of the cookie – a soft peanut butter cookie rolled in granulated sugar and topped with a Hershey's Kiss. However, many variations on the recipe have since evolved to include different flavors, both in the dough or as the topping.

The classic peanut butter blossom cookie can be easily adapted for different occasions.

Overview
The cookie originated in Gibsonburg, Ohio, as an entry into the 1957 Pillsbury Bake-Off contest. The cookie was originally named Black-eyed Susans, but was renamed by Pillsbury to the Peanut Butter Blossom cookie. 

The original cookie recipe can be found on the back of the Hershey's Kisses bag, and in the 9th Pillsbury Bake-Off Contest cookbook

Authors of dessert recipe books, cooking blogs and websites have since created their own variations on the cookie.

History

Invention
Freda Strasel Smith of Gibsonburg, Ohio, created the cookie by substituting chocolate chips out for Hershey's Kisses in a batch of peanut butter cookie dough. Due to the size of a Hershey's Kiss, it was placed on top in the center of the cookie after it was baked instead of mixed in the dough like a traditional chocolate chip peanut butter cookie.

In 1957, Smith entered the cookie, then called Black-eyed Susans, into the Pillsbury Bake-Off contest. Pillsbury changed the name to Peanut Butter Blossom following its success in the competition.

The peanut butter blossom cookie went through to the final round of the competition held in Beverly Hills, California, and finished in third place.

Later history
The peanut butter blossom cookie has become a recognized dessert across the US, largely due to Pillsbury and the Hershey Company capitalizing on the popularity of the cookie after the contest by using the recipe to promote their own brands.

In 1965, Pillsbury filmed a commercial in New York City featuring Freda Smith's daughter, Jo Anne Smith Lytle, making the famous peanut butter blossom cookies.

Pillsbury Company stated the Peanut Butter Blossom is one of the most famous recipes ever entered into the bake-off contest, despite it not winning 1st prize.

In 1999, the Peanut Butter Blossom cookie was one of ten recipes inducted into the Pillsbury Bake-Off Hall of Fame at the Smithsonian National Museum of American History in Washington, D.C.

Hershey's Marketing
The Hershey Company capitalized on the recipe by including it on every bag of Hershey's Kisses after Freda Smith placed in the 1957 competition, which helped promote and grow the peanut butter blossom cookie to what it is today – a cookie frequently found on Christmas dessert tables across the US, as well as a popular option on cookie tables at weddings.

The Original Peanut Butter Blossom
The original recipe created by Freda Smith can be found on Pillsbury's website, and is the same recipe Hershey still promotes to this day.

To make the Hershey's Kiss stick in the cookie, it needs to be pressed into the center as soon as the cookies come out of the oven and are still hot. It is advised the paper plume and aluminum foil be removed from the Kiss prior to baking the cookie.

Nutritional Information
1 cookie contains 90 calories, 6 grams of fat, 10 grams of carbs and 2 grams of protein.

Variations
There are many variations to this classic cookie. Cookbooks, cooking blogs and websites have published many twist on this easy, simple cookie recipe. To get more festive for holidays, bakers add colored sugar crystals, or to get more of a peanut butter taste, bakers use a peanut butter cup in place of the Hershey's Kiss. Some variations on the cookie use a Hershey's Hugs to add white chocolate into the cookie.

Another option is to add more chocolate by using cocoa powder in the dough.

See also
 List of cookies

References 

Cookies
Chocolate desserts
Peanut butter confectionery
American desserts